The Battle of Bir Hakeim took place at Bir Hakeim, an oasis in the Libyan desert south and west of Tobruk, during the Battle of Gazala (26 May – 21 June 1942). The 1st Free French Brigade under  Marie-Pierre Kœnig defended the position from  against Axis forces of Panzerarmee Afrika commanded  by   Erwin Rommel. The  captured Tobruk ten days later.

The delay imposed on the Axis offensive by the defence of Bir Hakeim influenced the cancellation of Operation Herkules, the Axis invasion of Malta. Rommel invaded Egypt, slowed by British delaying actions until the First Battle of El Alamein in July, where the Axis advance was stopped. Both sides used the battle for propaganda, Winston Churchill declared the Free French to be the "Fighting French".  Friedrich von Mellenthin wrote,

Background

Eighth Army
Both sides accumulated supplies for an offensive to forestall their opponent and General Claude Auchinleck, Commander in Chief of Middle East Command, hoped for the Eighth Army to be ready by May. British code-breakers tracked the dispatch of convoys to Libya as the British offensive on Axis shipping to North Africa was neutralised by Axis bombing of Malta and forecast that the Axis would attack first.

As the Eighth Army was not ready to take the offensive, Ritchie planned to fight a defensive battle on the Gazala line. Auchinleck's appreciation of the situation to Ritchie in mid-May anticipated either a frontal attack in the centre of the Gazala line followed by an advance on Tobruk or a flanking move to the south, looping around the Gazala line towards Tobruk. Auchinleck saw the former as more likely (with a feint on the flank to draw away the Eighth Army tanks) while Ritchie favoured the latter. Auchinleck suggested that British armour be concentrated near El Adem, where it would be well placed to meet either threat.

The first 112 of the new British 6-pounder (57 mm) anti-tank guns had arrived and been allotted to the motor brigades of the armoured divisions.

Panzerarmee Afrika/Armata Corazzata Africa

At the meeting of Axis leaders at Berchtesgaden on 1 May, it was agreed that Rommel should attack at the end of the month to capture Tobruk. The Panzer Army Africa (/) was to pause at the Egyptian border, while the Axis captured Malta in Operation Herkules and then Rommel was to invade Egypt. The  had finished converting to the up-armoured  and had  , known as Mark III Specials, with long-barrelled 5 cm KwK 39 guns. Four  (Mark IV Specials) with long-barrelled 7.5 cm KwK 40 guns had also arrived.  (German military intelligence) had broken some British military codes and in late 1941 penetrated Black, the code used by Bonner Fellers, a US military attaché in Egypt. The British divulged much tactical information to Fellers, who unwittingly reported it to the Axis as well as the US government.

Until May, Axis monthly deliveries to Libya averaged , less than a smaller Axis force received from June–October 1941 but sufficient for an offensive. The capture of Malta would not alter the constraints of port capacity and distance; protecting convoys and the use of a large port close to the front would still be necessary.

 (Operation Venice), the Axis plan of attack, was for tanks to advance around the brigade forming the Bir Hakeim "box" at the southern extremity of the Gazala line. On the left side of the manoeuvre, the Italian 132nd Armoured Division Ariete would neutralise the Bir Hakeim box. Further south, the 21st Panzer Division and 15th Panzer Division would advance through the desert, move east, then turn north behind the Gazala line to destroy the British armour and cut off the infantry divisions in the line.

The rest of the Italian XX Motorised Corps, the 101st Motorized Division Trieste, would open a gap in the minefield north of Bir Hakeim, near the Sidi Muftah box, to create a supply route to the panzers. The Axis tanks would be in a position next day to thrust westwards against the Eighth Army defensive boxes between Gazala and Alem Hamza, meeting the eastwards attack by the Italian X and XXI corps. By late May, the Axis forces comprised   and

Prelude

Gazala line

Between Gazala and Timimi (just west of Tobruk), the Eighth Army was able to concentrate its forces sufficiently to turn and fight. The Gazala line was a series of defensive boxes accommodating a brigade each, laid out across the desert behind minefields and wire, watched by regular patrols between the boxes. The line was not evenly manned, with a greater number of troops covering the coast road, leaving the south less protected but deep minefields had been laid in front of the boxes.

The longer line made an attack around the southern flank harder to supply. Behind the Gazala line were the Commonwealth Keep, Acroma, Knightsbridge and El Adem boxes, sited to block tracks and junctions. The box at Retma was finished just before the Axis offensive but work on the Point 171 and Bir el Gubi boxes did not begin until 25 May. By late May, the 1st South African Division was dug in nearest the coast, with the 50th (Northumbrian) Infantry Division to the south and 1st Free French Brigade furthest left at Bir Hakeim. The British 1st and 7th Armoured divisions waited behind the main line as a mobile counter-attack force, the 2nd South African Division garrisoned Tobruk and 5th Indian Infantry Division was in reserve. The British had   and

Bir Hakeim

The fortress at Bir Hakeim (Old Man's Well) had been built by the Ottomans and later used as a station by the Italian  (camel corps) to control movement at the crossroads of two Bedouin paths. On 14 February, the 150th Infantry Brigade was relieved at the box by the 1st Free French Brigade ( Marie Pierre Kœnig), part of XXX Corps (Lieutenant-General Willoughby Norrie). With a fighting strength of 3,000 men and a rear echelon of about 600 men based  to the east behind the line, the brigade comprised the 13th Demi-Brigade of the Foreign Legion (13e DBLE), an established unit and the backbone of the Free French, with the 2nd Colonial Demi-Brigade, a scratch combination of two battalions of new volunteers.

The 13e DBLE had been formed to fight in Finland but was used in the Norwegian campaign, being the first unit to the join the Free French in England. By mid-May the perimeter and central areas were honeycombed with  foxholes, gun emplacements and underground bunkers, deep camouflaged hides for vehicles and supply dumps. The interior of the fort was divided into zones, each the responsibility of a unit, with Kœnig's headquarters near the centre, at the crossroads. The V-shaped anti-tank and anti-personnel minefields were patrolled by the 3rd Foreign Legion Battalion (Lamaze), manning sixty-three Bren Gun Carriers divided into three squadrons. The patrols moved along lanes in the minefields, paying particular attention to the area north to the Sidi Muftah box at Got el Ualeb, held by the 150th Brigade.

Battle of Gazala

At  on 26 May, the Italian X and XXI Corps began a frontal attack on the central Gazala line. After dark, the armoured formations turned south in a sweeping move around the southern end of the Gazala line.

The 15th Panzer Division engaged the 4th Armoured Brigade, which had come south to support the 3rd Indian and 7th Motorised brigades. Their advance was stopped around noon by the 1st Armoured Division, in mutually costly fighting. On the right, the 90th Light Division forced the 7th Motorised Brigade out of Retma eastwards on Bir el Gubi. Advancing toward El Adem at mid-morning, armoured cars of the 90th Light Division overran and scattered the advanced HQ of the 7th Armoured Division (Major-General Frank Messervy), near Bir Beuid. Messervy was captured and removed his insignia, persuading the Germans that he was a batman; he escaped with several other men to rejoin the division. The 90th Light Division reached the El Adem area by mid-morning and captured several supply bases. The following day, the 4th Armoured Brigade moved on El Adem and forced the 90th Light Division to retire to the south-west.

Siege

27 May

The 15th and 21st Panzer divisions, the rest of the 90th Light Division and the "Ariete" Division began their large encircling move south of Bir Hakeim as planned. The 7th Motor Brigade was then attacked at Retma and forced back to Bir el Gubi. The 4th Armoured Brigade advanced in support and collided with the 15th Panzer Division; the 8th Hussars were destroyed and the 3rd Royal Tank Regiment (3rd RTR) lost many tanks. The British inflicted considerable losses in return but then retired to El Adem.

After over-running the 3rd Indian Motor Brigade, the VIII, IX, and X Medium Tank battalions of the 132nd Tank Infantry Regiment moved to the north-east of Bir Hakeim and the IX Battalion (Colonel Prestisimone) with sixty tanks, changed direction towards the fort. The IX Battalion arrived before the Bir Hakeim minefield and barbed wire at  charged and lost  and a  self-propelled gun. Ten tanks got through the minefield and were knocked out by  guns, causing  casualties. The remnants of the IX Battalion retired to the main body of the "Ariete" Division, which moved north towards Bir el Harmat around noon, following Rommel's original plan.

28–30 May

On 28 May, the Desert Air Force (DAF) made a maximum effort to attack Axis columns around El Adem and Bir Hakeim but in the poor visibility, bombed Bir Hakeim and its surroundings, misled by the Italian tank wrecks around the position and Kœnig sent a detachment to destroy the wrecks to avoid any more mistakes. A French column was sent to make contact with the 150th Infantry Brigade, stationed further to the north. After a few hours, Italian artillery forced them to retire but the French column destroyed seven half-tracks. On 29 May, the detachment of  Gabriel de Sairigné destroyed three German tanks, British air attacks intercepted two raids by Junkers Ju 87  dive-bombers and fighter-bombers attacked Axis supply lines south and east of Bir Hakeim. On 30 May,  from the 3rd Indian Motor Brigade, captured by the Axis and then released in the desert, reached the fort and added to the  already there, making the water shortage worse. The detachment of  Lamaze, at the request of the 7th Armoured Division, sealed off the breach opened the day before by the Axis tanks in the minefields. Led by Colonel Dimitri Amilakhvari, the legionnaires were ambushed but managed to retreat with the help of the Bren carriers of the 9th Company.

31 May–1 June

On 31 May, during a two-day sandstorm, fifty supply trucks of the 101st Transport Company ( Dulau), reached Bir Hakeim with water and took the Indians, prisoners and seriously wounded back to the British lines. The  had been forced to retreat westwards, to an area north of Bir Hakeim, which became known as the Cauldron, having attacked the 150th Infantry Brigade box since 28 May. During the day, the DAF lost sixteen aircraft (fifteen fighters and a bomber),  combat with Axis fighters and one to flak, the worst daily loss of the battle; the  lost nine aircraft. On the west side of the Cauldron, the 150th Infantry Brigade was overrun late on 1 June despite British relief attempts. The Axis troops that had been trapped gained a supply route through the Eighth Army minefields north of Bir Hakeim and next morning the encirclement of the fort was resumed by the 90th Light Division, Trieste Division and three armoured reconnaissance regiments from the 17th Infantry Division "Pavia". At  German troops approached from the south and Italian forces advanced from the north.

2–4 June

From  on 2 June, both sides exchanged artillery fire but the French field guns were out-ranged by German medium artillery and the fort was bombed by German and Italian aircraft.  dive bombers raided Bir Hakeim more than twenty times but the French positions were so well built as to be almost invulnerable. The British were unable to reinforce the French, who repulsed the "Ariete" Division attack but on 2 June, the DAF had an easily observed bomb line around the fort and concentrated on the area with fighter patrols and fighter-bomber attacks. The sight of scores of burning vehicles helped to maintain the morale of the defenders, who harassed Axis communications around the fort, as did the 7th Motor Brigade and the 29th Indian Infantry Brigade which were in the vicinity. On 4 June, DAF fighters and fighter-bombers disrupted Stuka attacks and bombed Axis vehicles, blowing up an ammunition wagon in view of the French but losing seven aircraft. Kœnig signalled Air Vice-Marshal Arthur Coningham. "" which brought the reply "".

5–7 June

The pioneers got within  of the fort, having breached the outer minefield and during the night they managed to clear several passages into the inner perimeter. German infantry gained a foothold but the French troops in foxholes, dug outs and blockhouses, maintained a great volume of small-arms fire, which forced the Germans under cover. Ritchie considered withdrawing the French from the fort to release the 7th Motor Brigade but decided to keep possession and on 7 June, four DAF raids were made against the Germans in the minefields. That night, a last convoy approached the fort and  Bellec got through the German lines, in thick fog to guide the convoy in. The Germans used the fog to prepare a final assault; tanks, 88 mm guns and Colonel Hecker's pioneers formed up in front of the fort.

8–9 June

On the morning of 8 June, after the defeat of Operation Aberdeen, Rommel released part of the 15th Panzer Division and Group Hecker for the siege. Rommel commanded an attack from the north, approaching as close as possible in thick fog, with artillery firing directly against the fortifications. The  made constant attacks, including a raid by  Stukas, three  ten Messerschmitt Me 110 twin-engined fighters escorted by  Just before  the attack began, aiming at a low rise which would overlook the French defences. The Chadian and Congolese defenders held on despite many casualties and in the afternoon, another sixty  bombed the perimeter and an attack was made all round the northern defences. An ammunition dump was blown up and the perimeter forced back. Kœnig reported that the garrison was exhausted, had suffered many casualties and was down to its reserve supplies; he asked for more air support and a relief operation. The DAF made another maximum effort, flew a record  and during the night, Hawker Hurricane fighters and Douglas Boston bombers dropped supplies to the garrison. The DAF lost eight fighters (three to Italian Macchi C.202s) and two bombers; the  lost two aircraft and the  one.

On the morning of 9 June, twenty  forty   escorted by fifty Me 110 and Bf 109 fighters, attacked Bir Hakeim. The Germans waited for the rest of the 15th Panzer Division to arrive as German artillery and aircraft bombarded the fort. Then a two-pronged attack struck the perimeter. The objective was Point 186, the top of a gentle rise in the ground which acted as a fire-control position for the garrison. A few skirmishes occurred between the 66th Infantry Regiment of the "Trieste" Division and the men commanded by Lieutenant Bourgoin, whose unit was down only to hand grenades. The  made a determined defence but was forced back, despite reinforcements of the 22nd North African Company.

In the afternoon, to the south near the old fort,  Ernst-Günther Baade led two battalions of Rifle Regiment 115 into the assault and in a costly advance, they established themselves within  of the fort by nightfall. At  as  bombed the north face of the fort, the German infantry and the 15th Panzer Division attacked behind an artillery barrage. The attackers breached the 9th Company lines and the central position of Aspirant Morvan but the situation was restored with a Bren Carrier counter-attack. Many DAF aircraft were unserviceable and the effort for the day was much reduced but two Hurricanes dropped medical supplies; diversions attempted by columns from the 7th Motor Brigade and the 29th Indian Infantry Brigade were too small to have much effect. In the afternoon Messervy, the commander of the 7th Armoured Division, signalled that a break-out might be necessary and Kœnig asked for DAF protection, for an evacuation at  that night. The request was made at too short notice and the garrison had to wait until the night of 10 June for a rendezvous to be arranged by the British to the south.

Retreat, 10–11 June

During 10 June, the French hung on and suffered many casualties; with only two hundred  and  rounds left, another attack on the northern sector against the Oubangui-Chari and 3rd Foreign Legion Battalion lines was contained by a counter-attack by the Messmer and Lamaze units, supported by Bren Gun Carriers and the last mortar rounds. In the afternoon, the biggest air attack of the siege, a raid by a hundred  dropped  of bombs. The last rounds of ammunition were issued and bodies searched for spare cartridges; Rommel predicted that Bir Hakeim would fall the next day but resisted pressure to attack with tanks, fearing that many would be lost in the minefields.

As darkness fell, sappers began to clear mines from the western face of the fortress, heavy equipment was prepared for demolition and two companies were detailed to stay behind to disguise the retirement. Mine clearance by the sappers took longer than expected and they were only able to clear a narrow passage, rather than a  corridor. Vehicles went astray and the ambulances and walking-wounded left the perimeter  late at  Kœnig put the fort under the command of Amilakhvari, the Foreign Legion commander and left the fort at the head of the column in his Ford, driven by Susan Travers, an Englishwoman, the only female member of French Foreign Legion (and one of several women, mostly British, present at the siege).

A flare rose and the Axis troops nearby opened fire. The HQ column guide got lost and was blown up three times by mines. The reception was organised by  Royal Army Service Corps (RASC) which drove lorries and guided extra field ambulances, with inexperienced rear-area crews, escorted by the 2nd King's Royal Rifle Corps (KRRC) and the 2nd Rifle Brigade on either side. The ambulances became separated in the dark but were found and guided to the rendezvous. About  of the original  escaped, including  during the day British patrols picked up stragglers.

Aftermath

Analysis

The Free French occupation of Bir Hakeim had lengthened the Axis supply route around the south end of the Gazala line, caused them losses and gave the British more time to recover in the wake of their defeat at the Cauldron. Free French morale was raised by its performance in the battle; a victory had been badly needed to show the Allies that the army of the French was a serious force, which could contribute to the war against Germany. The term Free French was replaced by Fighting French, because the battle had shown the world that a revival after the defeat in 1940 was under way; De Gaulle used it to undermine co-operation with the Vichy regime. In 1960, the British official historian Ian Playfair wrote

and Auchinleck said on 12 June 1942, "The United Nations need to be filled with admiration and gratitude in respect of these French troops and their brave General Kœnig". After the war,  Friedrich von Mellenthin wrote, "Some British officers have insinuated that French morale gave way but in the whole course of the desert war, we never encountered a more heroic and well-sustained defence".

Casualties

The  lost  eight in air fighting. In 2004, Douglas Porch recorded that the Axis took  at Bir Hakeim, only ten per cent of whom were French; Hitler had ordered that captured German political refugees were to be killed, an order which Rommel ignored.

Order of battle
1st Free French Brigade

Infantry
  (Colonel Dimitri Amilakvari)
 2nd  (II/13e DBLE)
 3rd  (III/13e DBLE) (63 × Bren Gun Carriers)
 2nd Colonial  (Lieutenant-Colonel Roux)
 2nd 
 1st  (Lieutenant-Colonel Broche)
 1st  (Major Jacques Savey)
 22nd North African Company (Captain Lequesne)
 2nd Anti-tank Company (Captain Jacquin)
 Signal, engineer and medical companies

Artillery
 1st Artillery Regiment (Colonel Laurent-Champrosay)
 24 × 75 mm guns (30 × used as anti-tank guns)
 7 × 47 mm APX anti-tank gun
 18 × 25 mm Hotchkiss anti-tank gun
 46 × Boys anti-tank rifles (British-supplied)
 18 × Bofors 40 mm gun anti-aircraft guns
 44 ×  and  mortars
 72 × Hotchkiss machine guns
 8 × heavy anti-aircraft machine-guns

Anti-aircraft
 1  (Commander Hubert Amyot d'Inville)
 12 × Bofors guns
 D Troop, 43rd Battery, 11th City of London Yeomanry (Rough Riders) Light Anti-Aircraft Regiment RA, 84 gunners
 6 × Bofors guns
 2 × 25-pounder guns

Ammunition
  shells.

See also

 North African campaign timeline
 List of World War II Battles

Notes

Citations

References

Books
 
 
 
 
 
 
 
 
 
 
 
 
 
 
 
 
 
 
 
 
 
 
 
 
 

Journals
 

Websites

Further reading

Books
 
 
 
 
 
 
 
 
 
 
 

Journals

External links

  Fondation de la France Libre, numéro spécial 70e anniversaire de la bataille de Bir Hakeim, n° 44, juin 2012
  Bir Hakeim, Verger, M.
(in French) Reenactment of the 13e DBLE in Bir Hakeim.
 Parliamentary Debates, House of Commons Official Report July 2, 1942
 Bonner Fellers and the Black Code

Western Desert campaign
Libya in World War II
Free French Forces
Battle of Bir Hakeim
Battles and operations of World War II involving India
Battles of World War II involving the United Kingdom
Battles of World War II involving Italy
Battles of World War II involving France
1942 in France
Battles of World War II involving Germany
Battles involving the French Foreign Legion
Erwin Rommel
Bir Hakeim
May 1942 events
June 1942 events
Tank battles involving Germany
Tank battles involving Italy
Tank battles involving the United Kingdom
1942 in Libya